Shouters may refer to:

 Nevi'im, the second main division of the Hebrew Bible 
 The Shouters, an offshoot Chinese Christian group labelled as a Christian sect by the PRC